is a Japanese original anime television series produced and animated by Bones that aired from January to April 2021 on ABC and TV Asahi's  programming block. A comedy manga spin-off began serialization on the Young Ace Up manga website in January 2021. A manga adaptation of the television series began serialization on the BookLive! e-book store in March 2021. A second season and an original video animation have been announced.

Plot
In Okinawa, a group of hardcore skaters participate in a secret, no-holds-barred competition after midnight known as "S", racing each other on skateboards down a winding road carved out of an abandoned mine and occasionally forming rivalries, also known as "beefs", with each other. Reki, a high school sophomore and hardcore skater, takes new transfer student Langa to S one night, and ends up pulling him into the world of skateboarding.

Characters

A cheerful and energetic high school sophomore who loves skateboarding and is addicted to the "S" races. He works at a local skate shop part-time as a mechanic and creates his own custom decks. He quickly becomes best friends with Langa and introduces him to skateboarding and S.
 / Snow

A half-Japanese student who transferred to Okinawa from Canada, with his mother, and ended up transferring into Reki's class. Growing up as a snowboarder, Langa quickly learns to transfer his skills into skateboarding when he jumps into his first "S" run. Always in a daze, he shows a stubborn side at times.

A cheeky first year junior high school student who has the ability to perform difficult tricks without difficulty and is looking to represent Japan in the Olympics. Loves cats and video games.
 / 

An "S" racer who wears a cape and heavy metal style makeup, and is a self-proclaimed "dynamite flower". He carries fireworks with him and isn't ashamed to use dirty tactics to win. Outside of S, he is a timid and kind-hearted florist in town.
 / Cherry Blossom

A high-tech "S" racer with pink hair who is a famous artificial intelligence (AI) calligrapher by day. Assisted by his AI partner Carla, he is a calculating and theoretical skater. He is a childhood friend of Nanjo's and often bickers with him.
 / 

Sakurayashiki's rival in "S" who is the owner and chef of an Italian restaurant by day. He has a cheerful and lustful personality, and his skating style is as dynamic as his body. He and Sakurayashiki have been friends since childhood.
 /  

The founder of "S" and a legendary skater. His true identity is still a mystery. Underneath his glittering mask, he hides the face of a popular young politician.
 / 

Ainosuke's secretary. He taught Ainosuke skateboarding. In "S", he is in charge of managing the baseball capped men behind the scenes.

Manager of the skateboard store Dope Sketch. He is also in charge of board adjustment.

The signature fennec fox of the skateboard store Dope Sketch. Only listens to the manager, Oka.

Sakurayashiki's favorite cutting-edge AI.

Langa's mother.

Production
In an interview with Wakanim, Studio No Border founder Thomas Romain said that after meeting with Bones about Carole and Tuesday, him and the other crew at his studio ran into Suzuki, a producer on the show. She asked the studio if they were interested in designing skateboards for an original show, of which they ended up agreeing to do. The skateboards were specifically designed so that they could work if built in real life. Juliette Mercier, who had previous experience designing skateboards, ended up doing most of the designs. After some small changes, they were approved. When it came to the decals, they were purposely stylized to be unique to each character in order to symbolize their personalities. Ayumi Kakei did the designs for Reki and Langa's skateboards, with a "pop" style. French comic book artist Loic Locatelli did the decals for Shadow and Joe, while Thomas Romain did Adam's himself. In total, five different artists from the studio worked on the series, which was a first for them.

The skaterboarders' moves were also inspired by real people, with one example being Miya's style, which has striking similarities to Rodney Mullen's style.

Bones also ran a weekly blog for the series, where they shared various concepts sketches by Hiroko Utsumi alongside each episode's release.

Media

Anime
On September 13, 2020, it was reported that Hiroko Utsumi and Bones were working on an anime television series project. Further details were not revealed until the following week. On September 20, 2020, the series was officially announced. Utsumi directed the series, while Ichirō Ōkouchi oversaw the series' scripts, Michinori Chiba designed the characters and served as chief animation director, and Ryō Takahashi composed the series' music. The series aired from January 10 to April 4, 2021 on ABC and TV Asahi's  programming block. The series ran for 12 episodes.

On July 4, 2021, a new anime project for the series was announced. On August 14, 2022, the project was revealed to be a second season and an original video animation (OVA). The main staff from the previous season are reprising their roles.

Aniplex of America licensed the series outside of Asia and streamed it on Funimation, AnimeLab, and Wakanim in their territories. In Southeast Asia, the series is licensed by Muse Communication, who streamed it on Bilibili. Muse later licensed the anime to Animax Asia for TV airings. Funimation produced a SimulDub for the series.

Episode list

Manga
A comedy manga spin-off by Toriyasu, titled Sk8 Chill Out!, began serialization  on Kadokawa Shoten's Young Ace Up manga website on January 11, 2021. A manga adaptation of the television series by Kazuto Kōjima released on the BookLive! e-book store under their Nino imprint starting on March 5, 2021.

Stage play

Two stage play adaptations were announced on July 4, 2021. SK8 Part 1 ran from December 2 to December 12, 2021. SK8 Part 2 was scheduled to take place from January 15 to January 24, 2022, but the shows were canceled after a staff member tested positive for COVID-19.

Notes

References

External links
  
  
  
 

2021 anime television series debuts
Adventure anime and manga
Anime with original screenplays
Aniplex
Asahi Broadcasting Corporation original programming
Bones (studio)
Kadokawa Shoten manga
Muse Communication
Seinen manga
Shōnen manga
Skateboarding mass media
Sports anime and manga
Television shows set in Okinawa Prefecture
Television shows written by Ichirō Ōkouchi
Upcoming anime television series